Numerous vessels in the 19th & 20th centuries have been named Zenobia for Zenobia, the Queen (c. 240–272 CE) of the Palmyrene Empire who conquered Egypt:

Merchant vessels
 , a British merchant ship that sailed out of Calcutta, India
 , carried ice from Alaska to San Francisco
 , a British merchant ship lost at sea while carrying coal from Newport
 , a ferry that sank on her maiden voyage on 7 June 1980
  (IMO: 9256535, MMSI: 636091047), a Liberian-flagged LPG tanker built in 2002

Naval vessels
 , several British Navy ships
 , a US Navy attack cargo ship

References

Ship names